River Subdivision may refer to:
River Subdivision (Canadian Pacific Railway) along the Mississippi River in Minnesota
River Subdivision (BNSF Railway) along the Mississippi River in Missouri
River Subdivision (CSX Transportation) along the Hudson River
River Subdivision (SCRRA) along the Los Angeles River in California
River Subdivision (Union Pacific Railroad) along the Missouri River
River Subdivision (Wheeling and Lake Erie Railway) along the Ohio River